Irevanly is a village and the least populous municipality in the Yevlakh District of Azerbaijan.

References 

Populated places in Yevlakh District